The Cañete Pirata, also known as Hidro Antonio Cañete de Reconocimiento (HACR), was a Spanish military parasol wing, single-engined flying boat flown in the late 1920s. Only one was built.

Design and development

The Pirata was designed by Antonio Cañete and built in the workshops of the Spanish military base of Mar Chica at Melilla on the North African coast, construction starting in 1926. As Spain had no manufacturer of light alloys, Cañete was forced to use galvanised iron in its structure.

Its parasol wing was in three parts, with a  span centre section and two  outer panels. In plan, the complete wing was straight tapered with squared-off tips and had a thick section with a thickness-chord ratio of 16%. Its wooden structure was built around twin spars with ash flanges and pine webs and the wing was covered with  plywood ahead and behind the spars and  ply between them.  A  pair of parallel struts from the upper fuselage supported the wing spars at about mid-span. Ailerons spanned most of the outer panel's trailing edges.

The Pirata was powered by a  water-cooled Lorraine 12E Courlis W12 engine, with a choice between direct or geared-down drive, mounted in the wing centre section. Its oil tank, with radiators on its outer  wall, was under the engine cowling between the spars but its two fuel tanks, each holding , were in the fuselage.

The Pirata's hull had a single-step planing bottom and flat sides, built around galvanised-iron frames and covered with corrugated metal sheet thicker ahead of the step than behind. Each was mounted on a pair of struts from the top of the wing struts and another pair of struts from the upper fuselage.

It had a crew of four in open cockpits. There was a gunner's position in the nose, equipped with a pair of Darne machine guns on a flexible mounting, with access to a hold containing  of bombs.  Pilot and flight engineer sat side by side in a second cockpit under the wing leading edge, from which the interior compartment of the hull holding the fuel tanks could be accessed via watertight doors. A dorsal gunner's post, similarly equipped to that in the nose, was under the trailing edge with a bomb store below.

The Pirata's triangular profile fin was an integral part of the fuselage and carried a comma-shaped, balanced rudder. Its angular tailplane, mounted on the fin and braced from below on V-struts to the lower hull, carried split, balanced elevators. The fixed tail surfaces were, like the wing, wood-framed and ply-covered, but the control surfaces were steel-tube framed and fabric-covered.

The date of the first flight of the Pirata is not known, but the aircraft and its designer were mentioned in 1927 and Les Ailes had an article on it planned almost a year before publication in September 1929.  By then it had made many flights. Tests had shown that its handling was good and that performance was significantly improved when the  engine was geared-down. Very little is known of its later history: there is no evidence of production and in Spain it would have been in competition with the Dornier Wal, which was being built locally from 1927.

Specifications

References

Flying boats
Parasol-wing aircraft
1920s Spanish aircraft